This is a list of museums in the Dominican Republic.

Museums in the Dominican Republic 

Alcázar de Colón
Columbus Lighthouse
Fortaleza San Felipe
Fortaleza San Luis
Memorial Museum of Dominican Resistance
Museo Bellapart
Museo de las Casas Reales
Museo del Hombre Dominicano

See also 

 List of forts in colonial Santo Domingo

External links 	

Museums
 
Museums
Dominican Republic
Museums
Dominican Republic